Johanna Kou (born 31 July 1975) is a New Caledonian badminton player. In 2009, she won the women's singles event at the Tahiti International tournament. She competed in four Pacific Games with the acquired of six gold, 4 silver and 2 bronze medals.

Achievements

Pacific Games 
Women's singles

Women's doubles

Mixed doubles

Pacific Mini Games 
Women's doubles

BWF International Challenge/Series (4 titles, 4 runners-up) 
Women's singles

Women's doubles

Mixed doubles

  BWF International Challenge tournament
  BWF International Series tournament
  BWF Future Series tournament

References

External links 
 

Living people
1975 births
People from Nouméa
New Caledonian female badminton players